Birinci Mayak (also, Birinci Nömräli Mayak, Pervomayskiy, and Pervyy Mayak) is a village and municipality in the Neftchala Rayon of Azerbaijan.  It has a population of 1,015.  The municipality consists of the villages of Birinci Mayak and Sübh.

References 

Populated places in Neftchala District